"Ruby Tuesday" is a song recorded by the Rolling Stones in 1966, released in January 1967. The song became the band's fourth number-one hit in the United States and reached number three in the United Kingdom as a double A-side with "Let's Spend the Night Together". The song was included in the American version of Between the Buttons (in the UK, singles were often excluded from studio albums).

Rolling Stone magazine ranked the song number 310 on their list of the 500 Greatest Songs of All Time.

Composition and recording

The Rolling Stones recorded "Ruby Tuesday" around November 1966 at Olympic Studios, during the sessions for their album Between the Buttons. The song was produced by Andrew Loog Oldham. Brian Jones plays a countermelody on an alto recorder, while the double bass was played jointly by bassist Bill Wyman and guitarist Keith Richards; Wyman did the fingerings while Richards bowed the instrument.

Richards explained that the lyrics are about Linda Keith, his girlfriend in the mid-1960s:

"That's a wonderful song," Mick Jagger told Jann Wenner in 1995. "It's just a nice melody, really. And a lovely lyric. Neither of which I wrote, but I always enjoy singing it." Wyman states in Rolling with the Stones that the lyrics were completely written by Richards with help from Jones on the musical composition. However, Marianne Faithfull recalls it differently; according to her, Jones  presented an early version of this melody to the rest of the Rolling Stones. According to Victor Bockris, Richards came up with the basic track and the words and finished the song with Jones in the studio.

Cash Box described the single as a "smooth ballad a la baroque."

Release
"Ruby Tuesday" was released as the B-side to "Let's Spend the Night Together" in January 1967. Due to the controversial nature of the A-side's lyrics, "Ruby Tuesday" earned more airplay and ended up charting higher in the US. The song topped the American Billboard Hot 100 chart, while reaching number three in the UK's Record Retailer chart, which listed "Let's Spend The Night Together"/"Ruby Tuesday" as a double A-side.

"Ruby Tuesday" was included on the US version of the 1967 album Between the Buttons, while being left out of the British edition, as was common practice with singles in the UK at that time. That summer, the song appeared on the US compilation album Flowers. Due to its success, the song became a staple of the band's compilations, being included on Through the Past, Darkly (Big Hits Vol. 2) (1969), Hot Rocks 1964–1971 (1971), Rolled Gold (1975), and 30 Greatest Hits (1977), and, in mono, on Singles Collection: The London Years (1989).

Personnel

According to authors Philippe Margotin and Jean-Michel Guesdon, except where noted:

The Rolling Stones
Mick Jagger vocals, tambourine
Keith Richards acoustic guitar, double bass (bowing)
Brian Jones alto recorder, backing vocals, piano
Bill Wyman double bass (fingering), bass guitar
Charlie Watts drums

Additional musician
Jack Nitzsche piano

Charts and certifications

Weekly charts

Year-end charts

Certifications

Live version

"Ruby Tuesday" was first played live on Brian Jones' last concert tour The Rolling Stones European Tour 1967. The next time was on the Steel Wheels/Urban Jungle Tour in 1989/1990. A concert rendition from this tour was featured on the band's 1991 live album Flashpoint and released as a single. This live version was recorded in Japan in 1990 and can be seen on the video release Live at the Tokyo Dome. The B-side was "Play with Fire (live)" recorded in 1989 but not included on the Flashpoint album.

A July 2013 live performance is featured on Sweet Summer Sun: Hyde Park Live.

Melanie version

American folk and pop singer Melanie recorded "Ruby Tuesday" for her 1970 album Candles in the Rain.  Her version was released as a single in the UK, where it became a Top Ten hit that year. It also reached number seven in New Zealand. She recorded a second cover version for her 1978 album Ballroom Streets.

Other cover versions
1968: Rotary Connection released a cover of the song on their debut album Rotary Connection.
1969: Oliver released a version of the song on his album Good Morning Starshine.
1989: Julian Lennon released a version of the song on the compilation album entitled The Wonder Years: Music from the Emmy Award-Winning Show & Its Era, a soundtrack for The Wonder Years TV series.
1993: Rod Stewart recorded a version for his 1993 compilation album, Lead Vocalist, and released it as a single through Warner Bros. Records on 8 February 1993. His cover reached number 11 on the UK Singles Chart. Across the rest of Europe, the song entered the top 40 in Belgium, Iceland, Ireland, and the Netherlands.

Restaurant chain
Samuel E. Beall III used the title of the song when he started his restaurant chain Ruby Tuesday. The name was suggested by one of several fraternity brothers who were co-investors.

Notes

References

Sources

 
 
 
 

1960s ballads
1967 singles
Baroque pop songs
Songs written by Jagger–Richards
Song recordings produced by Andrew Loog Oldham
The Rolling Stones songs
Buddah Records singles
Decca Records singles
London Records singles
Oliver (singer) songs
Melanie (singer) songs
Scorpions (band) songs
Julian Lennon songs
Rod Stewart songs
Marianne Faithfull songs
Billboard Hot 100 number-one singles
Cashbox number-one singles
Number-one singles in Germany
1967 songs
Pop ballads
Soul ballads
Psychedelic soul songs
British soul songs